Josef Kittler  is a British scientist and Distinguished Professor at University of Surrey, specialising in pattern recognition and machine intelligence.

Biography
Josef Kittler received his B.A. in Electrical Engineering (1971), PhD in Pattern Recognition (1974), and ScD (1992), all from University of Cambridge. He joined Surrey University in 1986 and became Distinguished Professor in 2004.

He founded Centre for Vision, Speech and Signal Processing (CVSSP) in 1986 at University of Surrey and served as president of the International Association for Pattern Recognition during 1994–1996. He is Series Editor of Springer Lecture Notes in Computer Science.

Academic works

On combining classifiers

They proposed the algebraic combination methods under the probabilistic framework used in ensembles of classifiers.

Awards and honours
 IAPR Fellow (1998).
 "For contributions to computer vision and pattern recognition, and for outstanding leadership in IAPR".
 IEE/IET Fellow (1999).
 IET fellowship honours those who "Lead by example. Inspire the next generation. Help to shape the profession."
 FREng (2000).
 Royal Academy of Engineering Fellows represent "the nation's best engineering researchers, innovators, entrepreneurs, business and industry leaders."
 KS Fu Prize (2006).
 This biennial prize is given to a living person "in recognition of an outstanding technical contribution to the field of pattern recognition".
 IET Faraday Medal (2008).
 The most prestigious of the IET Achievement Medals.
 EURASIP Fellow (2009).
 "For contributions to pattern recognition, image processing and computer vision".

Selected works

Books

Articles

References

External links
 Google Scholar, h-index is 79.

Alumni of the University of Cambridge
Academics of the University of Surrey
British scientists
Fellows of the International Association for Pattern Recognition
Fellows of the Royal Academy of Engineering